Aull may refer to:

Aull, Germany, a municipality in the district of Rhein-Lahn, Rhineland-Palatinate, Germany
Ashley Aull (born 1985), American beauty queen
Joe Aull (born 1948), American politician
Margaret Aull, New Zealand painter